The 2006 German Figure Skating Championships took place on December 27–30, 2005 at the LBZ Hohenschönhausen in Berlin. Skaters compete in the disciplines of men's singles, ladies' singles, pair skating, ice dancing, and synchronized skating at the senior and junior levels.

The first senior compulsory dance was the Yankee Polka and the second was the Tango Romantica. The first junior compulsory dance was the Austrian Waltz and the second was the Quickstep.

Medalists

Notes
 The competition had several guest skaters from Switzerland. They were: Jamal Othman (senior men) who placed 4th, Cindy Carquillat (senior ladies) who placed 10th, Leonie Krail / Oscar Peter (senior ice dancing) who placed 4th, Solene Pasztory / Andrew McCrary (junior ice dancing) who placed 6th, and Laurent Alvarez (junior men) who withdrew before the free skating. Because they were guest skaters, their results are not listed on the rank.

Senior results

Men

Ladies

Pairs

Ice dance

Synchronized

Junior results

Men

Ladies A

Ladies B

Pairs

Ice dance

Synchronized

External links

 2006 German Figure Skating Championships: Senior, junior, and novice synchronized results
 2006 German Figure Skating Championships: Youth and novice results

2005 in figure skating
German Figure Skating Championships, 2006
German Figure Skating Championships
|}